Intermission: the Greatest Hits (often just called Intermission) is a compilation  album released by DC Talk. It features songs from their studio albums beginning with Free at Last until their last full studio album; Supernatural. It also contains the tracks "Chance", "Sugar Coat It" and a remix of "Say the Words", which were recorded especially for this album.

To date, it is the most recent album by the group to contain original studio material.

Track listing

Music Videos
Colored People
Jesus is Just Alright
Between You and Me
Consume Me
Luv Is a Verb
Jesus Freak
The Hardway
I Wish We'd All Been Ready

References

DC Talk albums
2000 greatest hits albums
ForeFront Records compilation albums